Gamze is a female Turkish given name. An Arabic loan word, but common female name in Turkey. It denotes the dimple on someone's cheek when he or she smiles. It's considered as a feature of beauty. People named Gamze include:

 Gamze Bezan (born 1994), Turkish footballer
 Gamze Bulut (born 1992), Turkish middle distance runner
 Gamze Gürdal, Turkish Para Taekwondo practitioner
 Gamze İskeçeli (born 1983), Turkish footballer
 Gamze Nur Yaman (born 1999), Turkish women's footballer
 Gamze Özçelik (born 1982), Turkish actress
 Gamze Tazim (born 1989), Turkish-Dutch actress
 Zeynep Gamze Koçer (born 1998), Turkish footballer

References

Turkish feminine given names